County of Blachford is a cadastral unit located in the Australian state of South Australia that covers land between the east coast of Lake Torrens and the western side of the Flinders Ranges about  north-east of the city of Port Augusta.  It was proclaimed in 1877 and named after Frederic Rogers, 1st Baron Blachford who was the Under Secretary of State for the Colonies from 1860 to 1871.  It has been partially divided in the following sub-units of hundreds – Barndioota, Cotabena, Warrakimbo, Wonoka and Woolyana.

Description
It is bounded by the following counties - Taunton to the north and north-east, Hanson to the east, Granville to the south-east and by Newscastle to the south.

The county has a physical landscape consisting of a portion of the Flinders Ranges in its east and the floodplains draining from the ranges to Lake Torrens in its west.

The county’s principal town is Hawker which is located in its south-east corner.

The county is served by one principal road, The Outback Highway, which passes through the county in a north-south direction from Quorn in the south through the hundreds of Wonoka and Woolyana including the town centre of Hawker to Parachilna in the north.  The Outback Highway is also fed by traffic from the RM Williams Way which meets the highway to the south of Hawker.

The Marree railway line passes through the county in a north-easterly direction passing from the south via the hundreds of Warrakimbo, Barndiooota and Cotebena.

The county is located both within the state’s Pastoral Unincorporated Area and the local government area of the Flinders Ranges Council with the latter occupying its south-east corner.

Land use within the county is concerned with agriculture which is dominated by the grazing of livestock, mining and tourism.  Requirements published by the state government for both the ‘pastoral unincorporated area’ and the Flinders Ranges Council seeks to control land use and associated development to prevent “encroachment by incompatible land uses” and to protect the “scenic qualities of rural landscapes.”  The land is west of the Marree railway line which is zoned respectively as ‘pastoral’ and ‘primary production’ is the basic requirement where developments such as wind farms can be considered.  Land use and associated development to the east of the railway line is more highly controlled or even prohibited in some situations to conserve and protect “the natural character and environment of the area.”

History
The County of Blachford was proclaimed on 18 January 1877.  It was named after Frederic Rogers, 1st Baron Blachford who was the Under Secretary of State for the Colonies from 1860 to 1871.

The following hundreds have been proclaimed within the county - Wonoka in 1877, Woolyana in 1880, Barndioota in 1881, and Cotabena and Warrakimbo in 1888.

Constituent hundreds

Location of hundreds
The hundreds are laid out from east to west from the boundary with the County of Hanson in two rows as follows:
the northern row consisting of Woolyana and Cotabena, and 
the southern row consisting of Wonoka, Barndiotta and Warrakimbo

Hundred of Barndioota
The Hundred of Barndioota was proclaimed on 3 March 1881.

Hundred of Cotabena
The Hundred of Cotabena was proclaimed on 6 December 1888.

Hundred of Warrakimbo
The Hundred of Warrakimbo was proclaimed on 6 December 1888.

Hundred of Wonoka
The Hundred of Wonoka  was proclaimed on 18 January 1877.

Hundred of Woolyana
The Hundred of Woolyana was proclaimed on 5 August 1880. It is entirely located within the boundaries of the locality of Flinders Ranges.

Gallery

See also
Lands administrative divisions of South Australia
Blachford (disambiguation)

References

B
B
B